Carlos Carmona Bonet (born 5 July 1987) is a Spanish professional footballer who plays for CF Intercity as a right winger or attacking midfielder.

Club career
Born in Palma de Mallorca, Balearic Islands, Carmona began his career with RCD Mallorca, making his first-team – and La Liga – debut on 28 November 2004, at just 17, playing 12 minutes in a 2–0 away loss against Valencia CF. For the 2005–06 season he was loaned to Real Valladolid of Segunda División, being sparingly used during his spell (less than half of the league matches, no goals).

From 2006 to 2009, Carmona was also loaned, now to FC Cartagena in the Segunda División B, being instrumental in the club's promotion in his third year. Even though he had vowed to stay if that goal was achieved he was eventually released by Mallorca, and signed a three-year deal with Recreativo de Huelva on 2 July 2009.

Carmona alternated between the top flight and the second tier the following years, representing FC Barcelona B and Sporting de Gijón. He scored eight goals in 25 games in the 2016–17 campaign while with the latter side, not being able however to prevent relegation; additionally, he renewed his contract until 2021.

On 16 July 2021, after nine years at Sporting and 293 competitive appearances, free agent Carmona joined Segunda División RFEF club CF Intercity.

Career statistics

References

External links

1987 births
Living people
Spanish footballers
Footballers from Palma de Mallorca
Association football wingers
La Liga players
Segunda División players
Segunda División B players
Primera Federación players
Segunda Federación players
RCD Mallorca B players
RCD Mallorca players
Real Valladolid players
FC Cartagena footballers
Recreativo de Huelva players
FC Barcelona Atlètic players
Sporting de Gijón players
CF Intercity players
Spain youth international footballers